Gamma encoding may refer to:
Gamma correction, a digital image encoding optimization technique
Elias gamma coding, a positive integer data compression technique